Kevin DeWall is an American football coach.  He is the head football coach at Hobart and William Smith Colleges in Geneva, New York, a position he has held since 2018.  From 2015 to 2017, DeWall was head football coach at Endicott College in Beverly, Massachusetts.

DeWall previously served in a number of coaching roles at Hobart. He began his coaching career with the Hobart Statesmen football program in 2000, serving as the defensive backs coach for three seasons. He later served as offensive coordinator from 2003 to 2014.

DeWall led some of Hobart's most productive teams in program history, including guiding an offense that generated eight of the top nine scoring seasons and eight of the top 10 seasons of total offense in school history. In 2012 and 2014, Hobart football advanced to the NCAA quarterfinals.

In 2008, DeWall was inducted into the Waterloo Athletic Hall of Fame in Waterloo, New York. He has a bachelor's degree in biology from Hobart College.

Head coaching record

References

External links
 Hobart profile

Living people
American football safeties
Endicott Gulls football coaches
Hobart Statesmen football coaches
Hobart Statesmen football players
People from Waterloo, New York
Coaches of American football from New York (state)
Players of American football from New York (state)
1977 births